Chariot racing was one of the most popular ancient Greek, Roman, and Byzantine sports. In Greece, chariot racing played an essential role in aristocratic funeral games from a very early time. With the institution of formal races and permanent racetracks, chariot racing was adopted by many Greek states and their religious festivals. Horses and chariots were very costly. Their ownership was a preserve of the wealthiest aristocrats, whose reputations and status benefitted from offering such extravagant, exciting displays. Their successes could be further broadcast and celebrated through commissioned odes and other poetry. 

In standard racing practise, each chariot held a single driver and was pulled by four horses, or sometimes two. Drivers and horses risked serious injury or death through collisions and crashes; this added to the excitement and interest for spectators. Most charioteers were slaves or contracted professionals. While records almost invariably credit victorious owners and their horses for winning, their drivers are often not mentioned at all. In the ancient Olympic Games, and other Panhellenic Games, chariot racing was one of the most important equestrian events, and could be watched by unmarried women. Married women were banned from watching any Olympic events but a Spartan noble-woman is known to have trained horse-teams for the Olympics and won two races, one of them as driver.    

In ancient Rome, chariot racing was the most popular of many subsidised public entertainments, and was an essential component in several religious festivals. Roman chariot drivers had very low social status, but were paid a fee simply for taking part. Winners were celebrated and well paid for their victories, regardless of status, and the best could earn more than the wealthiest lawyers and senators. Racing team managers may have competed for the services of particularly skilled drivers and their horses. The drivers could compete as individuals, or under Team colours:  Blue, Green, Red or White. Spectators generally chose to support a single team, and identify themselves with its fortunes. Private betting on the races raised large sums for the teams, drivers and wealthy backers. Generous imperial subsidies of "bread and circuses" kept the Roman masses fed, entertained and distracted. Organised violence between rival racing factions was not uncommon, but it was generally contained. Roman and later Byzantine emperors, mistrustful of private organisations as potentially subversive, took control of the teams, especially the Blues and Greens, and appointed officials to manage them.

Chariot racing faded in importance in the Western Roman Empire after the fall of Rome. It survived much longer in the Eastern Roman Empire, where the traditional Roman chariot-racing factions continued to play a prominent role for several centuries. Supporters of the Blue teams vied with supporters of the Greens for control of foreign, domestic and religious policies, and Imperial subsidies for themselves. Their displays of civil disobedience culminated in an indiscriminate slaughter of Byzantine citizenry by the military in the Nika riots. Thereafter, rising costs and a failing economy saw the gradual decline of Byzantine chariot racing.

Early Greece
Images on pottery show that chariot racing existed in thirteenth century BC Mycenaean Greece. The first literary reference to a chariot race is in Homer's poetic account of the funeral games for Patroclus, in the Iliad, combining practices from the author's own time (c. 8th century) with accounts based on a legendary past. The participants in this race were drawn from leading figures among the Greeks; Diomedes of Argos, the poet Eumelus, the Achaean prince Antilochus, King Menelaus of Sparta, and the hero Meriones. The race, which was one lap around the stump of a tree, was won by Diomedes, who received a slave woman and a cauldron as his prize. A chariot race also was said to be the event that founded the Olympic Games; according to one legend, mentioned by Pindar, King Oenomaus challenged suitors for his daughter Hippodamia to a race, but was defeated by Pelops, who founded the Games in honour of his victory.

Olympic Games

The traditional foundation date for the Olympic Games is 776 BC. Pausanias claims that chariot races were added only from 680 BC (for the 13th Olympiad onwards), and that the games were extended from one day to two days to accommodate them. In this tradition, the foot race of a stadion (approximately 600 feet) offered the greatest prestige. Most modern scholars accept this as broadly accurate, but the sequence and date are described as "doubtful" by several modern sources, mainly on the grounds that the entrants represented wealthy, prestigious and powerful horse-owning aristocracies, especially the Eleans, whom all traditions describe as having founded the Olympic games. Further possible evidence for this connection is found in votive offerings associated with the Olympics, in which horses and chariots were dedicated in thanks for victory.  Pindar, the earliest source for the early Olympics, includes chariot racing among their five foundation events. Races for mules, and races for mares were tried, but soon abandoned. The single horse race (the keles) was a late arrival at the games, dropped early in their history. The major chariot-races of the Olympic Games, as well as the other Panhellenic Games, were four-horse (tethrippon, Greek: τέθριππον) and two-horse (synoris, Greek: συνωρὶς) events.

Pausanias describes the Olympic hippodrome of the second century AD, when Greece was part of the Roman Empire. The groundplan, southeast of the sanctuary itself, was approximately 780 meters long and 320 meters wide.  Competitors raced from the starting-place counter-clockwise around the nearest (western) turning post, head eastwards, then turned at the eastern turning post and headed back west. The number of circuits varied according to the event. Spectators could watch from natural embankments to the north, and artificial embankments to the south and east. A place on the western side of the north bank was reserved for the judges. Pausanias does not describe a central dividing barrier at Olympia, but archaeologist Vikatou presumes its existence.

Pausanias offers several theories regarding the origins of an object named Taraxippus ("Horse-disturber"), an ancient round altar, tomb or Heroon embedded within one of the entrance-ways to the track. It was thought to be malevolent, as it terrified horses for no apparent reason when they raced past it, and was a major cause of crashes. Pausanias reports that consequently "the charioteers offer sacrifice, and pray that Taraxippus may show himself propitious". It might simply have marked the most dangerous and difficult section of track, at the semi-circular end. Pausanias describes very similar, identically named places in other Greek hippodromes. Their name may have been an epithet of Poseidon, patron deity of horses and horse-racing    

    
Races began with a procession into the hippodrome, while a herald announced the names of the drivers and owners. The tethrippon consisted of twelve laps. The most immediate and challenging aspect of the races for drivers, judges and stewards was ensuring a fair start, and keeping false starts and crushes to a minimum. Then as now, the marshalling of over-excited racehorses could prove a major difficulty. Various mechanical devices were used to reduce the likelihood of human error. Portable starting gates (hyspleges, singular: hysplex), employed a tight cord in a wooden frame, loosened to drop forwards and start the race. According to Pausanias, the chariot furthest from the start-line began to move, followed by the rest in sequence, so that when the final gate was opened, all the chariots would be in motion at the starting line. A bronze eagle (a sign of Zeus, who was patron of the Olympic games) was raised to start the race, and at each lap, a bronze dolphin (a sign of Poseidon) was lowered. The central pair of horses did most of the heavy pulling, via the yoke. The flanking pair pulled and guided, using their traces. Horse teams were highly trained, and tractable. Greek aficionadoes thought mares the best horses for chariot racing.

Owners and charioteers

In most cases, the owner and the driver of the Greek racing chariot were different persons. In 416 BC, the Athenian general Alcibiades had seven chariots in the race, and came in first, second, and fourth; evidently, he could not have been racing all seven chariots himself. Chariot teams were costly to own and train, and the case of Alcibiades shows that for the wealthy, this was an effective and honourable form of self-publicity; they were not expected to risk their own lives. On the other hand, they were not necessarily dishonoured when they did. The poet Pindar praised Herodotes for driving his own chariot, "using his own hands rather than another's".  

Entries were exclusively Greek, or claimed to be so. Philip II of Macedon, pre-eminent through his conquest of most Greek states and self-promotion as a divinity, entered his horse and chariot teams in several major pan-Hellenic events, and won several. He celebrated the fact on his coinage, claiming it as divine confirmation of his legitimacy as Greek overlord. 

Women could win races through ownership, though there was a ban on the participation of married women as competitors or even spectators at the Olympics, on pain of death. This was not typical of Greek festivals in general, and there is no consistent record of this ban, or the penalty's enforcement.  The Spartan Cynisca, daughter of Archidamus II, entered and won the Olympic chariot race, twice as owner and trainer, and at least once as driver.  

Most charioteers were slaves or hired professionals. Drivers and their horses needed strength, skill, courage, endurance and prolonged, intensive training. Like jockeys, charioteers were ideally slight of build, and therefore often young, but unlike jockeys, they were also tall. The names of very few charioteers are known from the Greek racing circuits, Victory songs, epigrams and other monuments routinely omit the names of winning drivers. 

The chariots themselves resembled war chariots, essentially wooden two-wheeled carts with an open back, though by this time chariots were no longer used in battle. Charioteers stood throughout the race. They traditionally wore only a sleeved garment called a xystis, which would have offered at least some protection from crashes and dust. It fell to the ankles and was fastened high at the waist with a plain belt. Two straps that crossed high at the upper back prevented the xystis from "ballooning" during the race The body of the chariot rested on the axle, so the ride was bumpy. The most exciting parts of the chariot race, at least for the spectators, were the turns at the ends of the hippodrome. These turns were dangerous and sometimes deadly. In a full-sized racing stadium, the chariots could reach high speeds along the straights, then overturn or be crushed along with their horses and driver by the following chariots as they wheeled around the post. Driving into an opponent to make him crash was technically illegal, but most crashes were accidental and often unavoidable. In Homer's account of Patroclus' funeral games, Antilochus inflicts such a crash on Menelaus.

Pan-Hellenic festivals

Race winners were celebrated throughout the Greek festival circuit, both on their own account and on behalf of their cities. In the classical era, other great festivals emerged in Asia Minor, Magna Graecia, and the mainland, providing the opportunity for cities to compete for honour and renown, and for their athletes to gain fame and riches. Apart from the Olympics, the most notable were the Isthmian Games in Corinth, the Nemean Games, the Pythian Games in Delphi, and the Panathenaic Games in Athens, where the winner of the four-horse chariot race was awarded 140 amphorae of olive oil, a highly valued commodity. Prizes elsewhere included corn in Eleusis, bronze shields in Argos, and silver vessels in Marathon. Winning Greek athletes, no matter their social status, were greatly honoured by their own communities.  Chariot racing at the Panathenaic Games included a two-man event, the apobatai, in which one of the team was armoured, and periodically leapt off the moving chariot, ran alongside it, then leapt back on again. The second charioteer took the reins when the apobates jumped out; in the catalogues of winners, the names of both these athletes are given. Images of this contest show warriors, armed with helmets and shields, perched on the back of their racing chariots. Some scholars believe that the event preserved traditions of Homeric warfare.

Roman

The Romans probably borrowed chariot racing and the design of the racing tracks from the Etruscans, who in turn had borrowed them from the Greeks. Rome's public entertainments were also influenced directly by Greek examples. According to Roman legend, chariot racing was used by Romulus just after he founded Rome in 753 BC as a way of distracting the Sabine men. Romulus sent out invitations to the neighbouring towns to celebrate the festival of the Consualia, which included both horse races and chariot races at the Circus Maximus, in honour of the corn-god Consus. While the Sabines were enjoying the spectacle, Romulus and his men seized and carried off the Sabine women, who became wives of the Romans and were instrumental in persuading Sabine and Romans to unite as one people. Chariot racing thus played a part in Rome's foundation myth. 

Chariot races were a part of several Roman religious festivals, and on these occasions were preceded by a parade (pompa circensis) that featured the charioteers, music, costumed dancers, and images of the gods. These last were placed on dining couches to observe the proceedings, which were nominally held in their honour. The pompa circensis was headed by an image of Victoria, goddess of victory. Several deities had permanent temples, shrines or images on the dividing barrier (spina or euripus) of the circus. While the entertainment value of chariot races tended to overshadow any sacred purpose, in late antiquity the Church Fathers still saw them as a traditional "pagan" practice, and advised Christians not to participate. Soon after the end of the Roman Empire in the West, the influential Christian scholar, administrator and historian Cassiodorus describes chariot racing as an instrument of the Devil.

Roman circuses

Most cities had one or more chariot racing circuits. The city of Rome had several; its main centre was the Circus Maximus which developed on the natural slopes and valley (the Vallis Murcia) between the Palatine Hill and Aventine Hill. It had a vast seating capacity; Boatwright estimates this as 150,000 before its rebuilding under Julius Caesar, and 250,000 under Trajan. According to Humphrey, the higher seating estimate is traditional but excessive, and even at its greatest capacity, the circus probably accommodated no more than about 150,000. It was Rome's earliest and greatest circus. Its basic form and footprint were thought more or less co-eval with the city's foundation, or with Rome's earliest Etruscan kings. It had a semi-circular end, and a semi-open, slightly angled end where the chariots lined up across the track to begin the race, each enclosed within a cell known as a carcere ("prison") behind a spring-loaded gate. These were functionally equivalent to the Greek hysplex but were further staggered to accommodate a median barrier, known originally as a euripus (canal) but much later as the spina (spine). When the chariots were ready the host (editor) of the race, usually a high-status magistrate, dropped a white cloth; all the gates sprang open at the same time, allowing a fair start for all participants. Races were run counter-clockwise; starting positions were allocated by lottery.

The spina also carried lap-counters, in the form of eggs or dolphins; the eggs were suggestive of Castor and Pollux, the dioscuri, born to Queen Leda and thought to be patrons of Rome's chariot races. Dolphins were thought to be the swiftest of all creatures; they also symbolised Neptune, god of the sea, earthquakes and horses. The spina seems to have had water-feature elements, blended with decorative and architectural features. It eventually became very elaborate, with temples, statues and obelisks and other forms of art, but the addition of these multiple adornments obstructed the view of spectators on the trackside's lower seats, which were close to the action, and happened to be reserved for senators. At each end of the spina was a meta, or turning point, consisting of three large gilded columns.

The races
Seats in the Circus were free for the poor, and either free or subsidised for the mass of citizens (Plebs), whose lack of involvement in late Republican and Imperial politics was compensated, as far as Juvenal was concerned, by an endless supply of entertainments, or panem et circenses ("bread and circuses"). The wealthy could pay for shaded seats where they had a better view.  The circus was one of few places where the elite, and in particular the emperor, could be seen by a populace assembled in vast numbers, and where the latter could manifest their affection or anger. The sponsor or editor of the races shared a viewing box and its couches with images of the gods. In the  Imperial era, the box itself took its name (pulvinar) from these couches. The  pulvinar in the Circus Maximus was directly connected to the imperial palace, on the Palatine Hill.

Once the race was started, the chariot drivers jockeyed for position, cutting across the paths of their competitors, moving as close to the spina as they could, and whenever possible forcing their opponents to find another, much longer route forwards. Roman drivers wrapped the reins round their waist, and steered using their body weight; with the reins looped around their torsos, they could lean from one side to the other to direct the horses' movement while keeping the hands free "for the whip and such".. A driver who became entangled in a crash risked being trampled or dragged along the track by his own horses; charioteers carried a curved knife (falx) to cut their reins, and wore helmets and other protective gear  Spectacular crashes in which the chariot was destroyed and the charioteer and horses incapacitated were called naufragia, (a "shipwreck").

The best charioteers could earn a great deal of prize money, in addition to their contracted subsistence pay. The prize money for up to fourth place was advertised beforehand, with first place winning up to 60,000 sesterces. Detailed records were kept of drivers' performances, and the names, breeds and pedigrees of famous horses. Betting on results was widespread, among all classes. Most races involved four-horse chariots (quadrigae), or less often, two-horse chariots (bigae). Just to display the skill of the driver and his horses,  up to ten horses could be yoked to a single chariot. The quadriga races were the most important and frequent.

Frequency and laps
Magnates and emperors courted popularity by subsidising as many races as they could; the more winners the better. In Rome, races usually lasted for 7 laps (and later 5 laps, so that there could be even more races per day) rather than the 12 laps of the Greek race.Emperors Caligula (sponsoring 10–12 races a day) and Nero (sponsoring 20–24 a day) were notoriously spendthrift enthusiasts; so was the emperor Commodus, who once held and subsidised 30 races in just 2 hours in a single afternoon. Dio Cassius predicted that such extravagance could only lead to Imperial bankruptcy. In a previous century, the emperor Domitian had managed to squeeze an extraordinary 100 races into a single afternoon, presumably by drastically lowering the number of laps from the standard 7. Twenty four races in a single day became the norm, until the slow collapse of Rome's economy in the West, when costs rose, sponsors were lost and racetracks were abandoned.In the 4th century AD, 24 races were held every day on 66 days each year. By the end of that century public entertainments in Italy had come to an end in all but a few towns. The last recorded race in Rome took place in the Circus Maximus in 549 AD, staged by the Ostrogothic King, Totila; whether this was a display of horsemanship or a chariot-race is not known

Factions
Most Roman chariot drivers belonged to one or another of four factions, social and business organisations that raised money to sponsor the races. The factions offered security to members in return for their loyalty and contribution, and were headed by a patron or patrons. Every circus seems to have independently followed the same model of organisation, including the four-colour naming system; Red, White, Blue and Green. Senior managers (domini factionum) were usually of equestrian class. Investors were often wealthy, but of low social status; driving a racing chariot was thought a very low class occupation, beneath the dignity of any citizen, but making money from it was truly disgraceful, so investors of high social status usually resorted to negotiations discretely, through agents, rather than risk loss of reputation, status and privilege through infamia. No contemporary source describes these factions as official, but unlike many unofficial organisations in Rome, they were evidently tolerated as useful and effective rather than feared as secretive and potentially subversive. 

Tertullian claims that there were originally just two factions, White and Red, sacred to winter and summer respectively. By his time, there were four factions; the Reds were dedicated to Mars, the Whites to the Zephyrs, the Greens to Mother Earth or spring, and the Blues to the sky and sea or autumn. Each faction could enter a team of up to three chariots per race. Members of the same team often collaborated against the other teams, for example to force them to crash into the spina (a legal and encouraged tactic). The driver's clothing was color-coded in accordance with his faction, which would help distant spectators to keep track of the race's progress.

The emperor Domitian created two new factions, the Purples and Golds, but they vanished from the record very soon after his death. The Blues and the Greens gradually became the most prestigious factions, supported by emperors and the populace alike. Blue versus Green clashes sometimes broke out during the races. The Reds and Whites are seldom mentioned in the literature, but their continued activity is documented in inscriptions and in curse tablets.

Roman charioteers
Most Roman charioteers would have started their careers as slaves, or at best as low-status freedmen and citizen-commoners. Most races and wins were team efforts, results of co-operation between charioteers of the same faction, but victories won in single races were the most highly esteemed by drivers and their public. All competitors, regardless of their social status, were paid a driver's fee. Slave-charioteers could not lawfully own any property, including money, but their masters could pay them regardless, or retain all or some of their accumulated driving fees and winnings on their behalf, as the price of their eventual manumission. While most freed slave-charioteers would have become clients of their former master, some would have earned more than enough to buy their freedom outright, assuming they survived that long. Gaius Appuleius Diocles won 1,462 out of 4,257 races for various teams during his exceptionally long and lucky career. When he retired at the age of 42, his lifetime winnings reportedly totalled 35,863,120 sesterces (HS), not counting driver's fees. His personal share of this is unknown  but Vamplew calculates that even if Diocles' personal winnings were only a tenth part of the declared prize money, this would have yielded him an average annual income of 150,000 HS. Scorpus won over 2,000 races before being killed in a collision at the meta when he was about 27 years old. The charioteer Florus' tomb inscription describes him as infans (not adult).   

Charioteers occupied a peculiar position in Roman society. If they were originally citizens, their chosen career made them  infames, which automatically disqualified them from many of the privileges, protections and dignities of full citizenship, and placed them in a socially despised category that included undertakers, pimps, butchers, executioners, heralds and various paid entertainers such as gladiators and actors, some of whom could acquire near-fabulous wealth despite their originally humble status. Juvenal bewailed that the earnings of the charioteer Lacerta were a hundred times more than a lawyer's fee. Two jurists of the later Imperial era argue against the "infamous" status of charioteers, on the grounds that athletic competitions were not mere entertainment but "seemed useful" as honourable displays of Roman strength and virtus.  The best charioteers were also wildly popular. They followed a ferociously competitive, charismatic profession, routinely risked violent death, and aroused a compulsive, even morbid enthusiasm among their followers. A supporter of the Red faction is said to have thrown himself on the funeral pyre of his favourite charioteer. More usually, some charioteers and supporters tried to enlist supernatural help by covertly burying curse tablets at or near the track, appealing to spirits and deities of the underworld for the success of their favourites or disaster for their opponents; a common practise among Romans of all classes though like all magic, strictly illegal, and punishable by death.

Some of the most talented and successful charioteers were suspected of winning through the illicit agency of dark forces. Ammianus Marcellinus, writing during Valentinian's reign (AD 364–375) describes various cases of chariot drivers prosecuted for witchcraft or the procurement of spells. One charioteer was beheaded for having his young son trained in witchcraft to help him win his races; and another burnt at the stake for practising witchcraft. Justinian I's reformed legal code specifically prohibits drivers from placing curses on their opponents, and invites their co-operation in bringing offenders before the authorities, rather than acting like assassins or vigilantes. This not only reiterates a very longstanding prohibition of witchcraft but confirms a reputation that charioteers had for living at the very edge of the law, for violent thefts and bullying, and an easy-going criminality that could extend to the murder of opponents and enemies, disguised as rough but rightful justice.

Horses
The horses, too, could become celebrities; they were purpose-bred and were trained relatively late, from 5 years old. The Romans favoured particular native breeds from Hispania and north Africa. One of Diocles' horses, named Cotynus, raced with him in various teams 445 times, alongside Abigeius, a treasured "trace" horse. A chariot's "trace" horses partly pulled the chariot and partly guided it, as flankers to the central pair, who were yoked to the chariot and provided both speed and power. A left-side trace horse's steady performance could mean the difference between victory and disaster; mares were thought the steadiest.  Left-side trace horses were the closest to the spina, and are most likely to be named in the race record. Another key performer in a standard quadriga race was the right-hand yoke-horse. Celebrity horses named in Diocles' extraordinary record of 445 races and more than 100 wins in a year include Pompeianus, Lucidus and Galata.

Byzantine Hippodrome 
Constantine I (r. 306–337) refounded the Eastern Greek city of Byzantium as a "New Rome", to serve as the administrative center of the eastern half of the Empire, and re-named it Constantinople. He replaced or restored the city's chariot-racing circuit (hippodrome), which had been provided by Septimius Severus. As a Christian emperor, or at least one with Christian leanings, Constantine preferred chariot racing to gladiatorial combat, which he considered a vestige of paganism. The religious ceremonies embedded in traditional public spectacles had been a matter of concern for Christian apologists since at least Tertullian's time. It was thought that such ceremonies, even if merely observed by spectators, could only do spiritual harm.   The Olympic Games were eventually ended by Emperor Theodosius I (r. 379–395) in 393, perhaps in a move to supress paganism and promote Christianity, but chariot racing remained popular. The Church did not, or perhaps could not prevent it, although prominent Christian writers attacked it.

Byzantine charioteers 
Very little source material has survived as a basis for accurate statistics in Byzantine chariot racing. Just six of the more famous and celebrated Byzantine charioteers are known, through short, laudatory verse epigrams. The six are Anastasius; Julianus of Tyre; Faustinus and his son Constantinus; Uranius; and Porphyrius. The single epigram to Anastasius offers very little personal information, but Porphyrius is the subject of thirty-four. He is described as the best charioteer of his time; and as the only charioteer known to have won the diversium twice in one day.

The diversium was unique to Byzantine chariot racing, a formal rematch between the winner and a loser, in which the competing charioteers drove each others team and chariot. A winning charioteer could thus win twice over, driving the same horse team that he had defeated earlier, and virtually eliminate mere chance or better horses as the deciding factors in his victory. In Byzantine chariot racing, the expected standards of professional athleticsm were very high. Preparation for races could involve ritualised public dialogues between charioteers, imperial officials and emperors, a prescribed liturgy of questions, answers, and processional orders of precedence.

Byzantine racing factions 
In the eastern provinces, and Constantinople itself, the earliest evidence for colour factions is from AD 315, coincident with the extension of Imperial authority into local government and public life. The cost of financing the races was split between the factions, the state, the Emperors, and senior officials. The annually appointed consuls were obliged to personally fund their own inaugural games.   

In Byzantium as elsewhere, racing fans cheered on their favorite charioteers, but increasingly, their overriding loyalty appears to have been to a faction or colour. Charioteers could change their factional allegiance during their careers, but their fans did not necessarily follow them.  Semi-permanent alliances of Blues (Vénetoi) and Greens (Prásinoi) overshadowed the Whites (Leukoí) and Reds (Roúsioi). In the 5th century, the outstanding Byzantine charioteer Porphyrius raced as a "Blue" or a "Green" at various times and was celebrated by each faction, by the reigning Emperor, and by several imperially subsidised monuments on a grand scale in the Hippodrome. While the racing factions, their supporters and the populace at large were overwhelmingly composed of commoners, as in Rome, Cameron (1976) sees no justification for the description of any Byzantine racing faction, racing sponsor or factional ideology as "populist", nor the conflicts between factions and authorities as expressions of "class conflict" or religious difference. The urban mass disturbances that characterise much of Byzantium's early history were not associated with racing factions until the 5th century, when the Imperial government appointed managers of both the Circus races and the Theatres, responsible for the production and performance of the chants, theatrical displays and lavish religious ceremonies that accompanied Imperial court rituals and chariot races. The acclamations of emperors and of winning charioteers employed much the same triumphalist language, symbolism, honours and pledges of allegiance. The factions were understood to represent the loyal commoners, or "the people".

Social discontent and disturbances in Constantinople tended to focus on the Hippodrome and Kathisma (the Imperial viewing box). In 498, the crowd showed its dissatisfaction with the emperor Anastasius by launching a hail of stones at the kathisma; during a near-revolutionary riot of 512 at the Hippodrome, the same emperor feared for his life, and offered to abdicate. Byzantium's theatre claques, which already had a reputation for well-organised violence, were now identified with the racing factions, and were thought to represent the rowdiest, most uncontrolable elements among the Blues and Greens. Blue–Green rivalry often erupted into gang warfare. Justin I (r. 518–527) took severe measures against urban violence after a citizen was murdered in the church of Hagia Sophia. Long-running factional disorder culminated in the Nika riots of 532 AD, during the reign of Justinian, when the Blues and Greens united and attempted unsuccessfully to overthrow the emperor. Thousands were killed by the Byzantine military in retribution.

Civil law reforms enacted by Justinian I in 541 ensured that only emperors or their representatives could subsidise the races; soon after, the emperor Tiberius II Constantine curbed imperial spending on the factions, which further reduced their power and influence. Chariot racing declined further in the course of the seventh century, in line with the Empire's dwindling economy and loss of territory. After the Nika riots, the factions had become less antagonistic to imperial authority as their importance in imperial ceremony increased. The iconoclast emperor Constantine V (r. 741–775) deployed both Green and Blue "rowdies" in his anti-monastic campaigns, staging theatrical shows in which monks and nuns were exposed to public ridicule, abuse and forced marriages.  The number of races per race-day declined sharply to 8, in the 10th century. The racing factions in Byzantium continued their activity, though much reduced, until the imperial court was moved to Blachernae during the 12th century.

See also
 Carriage driving
 Harness racing
 Oval track racing

Footnotes

References

Sources

Primary sources

 
 
 Pausanias. Description of Greece, Book 6: Elis II. English translation Perseus program.
 Pindar. Isthmian Odes – Isthmian 1. See original text in Perseus program.
 Pindar. Olympian Odes – Olympian 1. See original text in Perseus program.
 Pindar. Pythian Odes – Pythian 5. See original text in Perseus program.
 
 
 Tertullian. De Spectaculis. See original text in the Latin library.

Secondary sources

External links
 Chariot Races (United Nations of Roma Victrix (UNRV) History – Roman Empire)
 The Circus: Roman Chariot Racing (VRoma: A Virtual Community for Teaching and Learning Classics)
 The Games: Chariot Racing
 Historic Overview: Roman Army and Chariot Racing (RACE) Jerash Jordan
 Peter Donnelly – Some Observations on Roman Chariot-Racing 
 Pasko Varnica – Sports In Antiquity

 
Ancient Olympic sports
Ancient Roman sports
Horse racing